The League of Albanians of Romania (ALAR; , LSR) is an ethnic minority political party in Romania representing the Albanian community.

History
The ALAR was established on 30 June 1999. In the 2000 general elections it defeated the Cultural Union of Albanians of Romania to win the single seat reserved for the Albanian community in the Chamber of Deputies under the electoral law allowing political parties representing ethnic minority groups to be exempt from the electoral threshold only applied as long as they received 10% of the vote required for a single seat in the Chamber of Deputies. It has retained its seat in every election since.

Electoral history

References

External links
Official website

Non-registered political parties in Romania
Political parties of minorities in Romania
Albanians in Romania
Political parties established in 1999
1999 establishments in Romania